Nubuck (pronounced ) is top-grain leather that has been sanded or buffed on the grain side, or outside, to give a slight nap of short protein fibers, producing a velvet-like surface. It is resistant to wear, and may be white or coloured.

Nubuck is similar to suede, but is created from the outer side of a hide, giving it more strength and thickness and a fine grain. It is generally more expensive than suede, and must be coloured or dyed heavily to cover up the sanding and stamping process.

Nubuck characteristics are similar to aniline leather. It is soft to the touch, scratches easily, and water drops darken it temporarily (it dries to its original color). Shoes and auto interiors are some of the most common commercial uses for this leather.

The word nubuck probably comes from new + buck(skin).

References

Further reading

 

Leather